Alleghenyville is a census-designated place (CDP) in Brecknock Township, Berks County, Pennsylvania, United States. It is located near the Lancaster County line, and is served by the Governor Mifflin School District.  As of the 2010 census the population was 1,134.

Demographics

References

 

Census-designated places in Berks County, Pennsylvania
Census-designated places in Pennsylvania